The Pine Bluff Arsenal Access Road Bridge No. 2280 is a historic bridge near White Hall, Arkansas. It carries East Hoadley Road (Arkansas Highway 256) over Caney Creek, between the town and the Pine Bluff Arsenal. It consists of a concrete deck supported by abutments and four cast concrete piers, carrying a roadway  in width. It was built in 1942 with funds authorized by the National Defense Highway Act of 1941, in order to facilitate access between the arsenal (founded in 1941) and existing transportation networks.

The bridge was listed on the National Register of Historic Places in 2019.

See also
List of bridges on the National Register of Historic Places in Arkansas
National Register of Historic Places listings in Jefferson County, Arkansas

References

1942 establishments in Arkansas
Bridges completed in 1942
Buildings and structures in Jefferson County, Arkansas
National Register of Historic Places in Jefferson County, Arkansas
Pine Bluff Arsenal
Road bridges on the National Register of Historic Places in Arkansas